Aberbeeg railway station served the village of Aberbeeg in Monmouthshire, Wales.  It was the junction where the Monmouthshire Railway and Canal Company's lines from Newport to Brynmawr and Ebbw Vale diverged.

History
Opened by the Monmouthshire Railway and Canal Company on 21/23 December 1850, it became part of the Great Western Railway in 1880 and remained there at the Grouping of 1923. The line then passed on to the Western Region of British Railways on nationalisation in 1948. The station was closed to passengers by the British Transport Commission on 30 April 1962, remaining open for goods traffic until 28 November 1966.

The site today

The mooted extension of the railway line to  would involve relaying the line from Aberbeeg that was lifted in the early 1990s.

References

Notes

Sources

External links
Archive of Ebbw Valley Railway Scheme website (Blaenau Gwent council, 2008)
Aberbeeg station on navigable O.S. map
Remains of the station in 1989
Remains of the station in 2002
Train passing the site of the station in 2008

History of Monmouthshire
Disused railway stations in Blaenau Gwent
Former Great Western Railway stations
Railway stations in Great Britain opened in 1850
Railway stations in Great Britain closed in 1962
1850 establishments in Wales
1962 disestablishments in Wales